Oakbrook is a census-designated place (CDP) in Boone County, Kentucky, United States. The population was 9,036 at the 2010 census.

Geography
Oakbrook is located in eastern Boone County at  (39.001030, -84.683100). It is bordered by the city of Florence to the east and south, and by the unincorporated Burlington (the county seat) to the west. Kentucky Route 18 (Burlington Pike) forms the northern edge of the Oakbrook CDP.

Demographics

As of the census of 2000, there were 7,726 people, 2,926 households, and 2,206 families residing in the CDP. The racial makeup of the CDP was 94.81% White, 1.84% African American, 0.10% Native American, 2.10% Asian, 0.36% from other races, and 0.79% from two or more races. Hispanic or Latino of any race were 1.06% of the population.

There were 2,926 households, out of which 38.7% had children under the age of 18 living with them, 67.2% were married couples living together, 6.3% had a female householder with no husband present, and 24.6% were non-families. 20.8% of all households were made up of individuals, and 4.3% had someone living alone who was 65 years of age or older. The average household size was 2.64 and the average family size was 3.10.

In the CDP, the population was spread out, with 27.9% under the age of 18, 6.4% from 18 to 24, 36.0% from 25 to 44, 22.8% from 45 to 64, and 7.0% who were 65 years of age or older. The median age was 34 years. For every 100 females, there were 97.4 males. For every 100 females age 18 and over, there were 93.7 males.

The median income for a household in the CDP was $62,023, and the median income for a family was $72,083. Males had a median income of $51,202 versus $32,446 for females. The per capita income for the CDP was $27,575. About 1.2% of families and 1.1% of the population were below the poverty line, including 0.5% of those under age 18 and 2.1% of those age 65 or over.

References

Census-designated places in Boone County, Kentucky
Census-designated places in Kentucky